Lake Summerset is a census-designated place (CDP) in Stephenson and Winnebago counties in Illinois. The population was 2,048 at the 2010 census.

Geography

Lake Summerset is located at  (42.449436, -89.396392).

Demographics

At the 2000 census there were 2,061 people, 816 households, and 677 families in the CDP. The racial makeup of the CDP was 98.88% White, 0.24% African American, 0.05% Native American, 0.19% Asian, and 0.63% from two or more races. Hispanic or Latino of any race were 0.68%.

Of the 816 households 25.6% had children under the age of 18 living with them, 77.7% were married couples living together, 3.6% had a female householder with no husband present, and 17.0% were non-families. 13.5% of households were one person and 7.6% were one person aged 65 or older. The average household size was 2.53 and the average family size was 2.76.

The age distribution was 21.7% under the age of 18, 4.2% from 18 to 24, 22.1% from 25 to 44, 29.8% from 45 to 64, and 22.2% 65 or older. The median age was 47 years. For every 100 females, there were 95.7 males. For every 100 females age 18 and over, there were 99.0 males.

The median household income was $59,648 and the median family income  was $65,066. Males had a median income of $50,522 versus $27,708 for females. The per capita income for the CDP was $27,160. About 1.0% of families and 0.8% of the population were below the poverty line, including none of those under the age of eighteen or sixty-five or over.

References

External links
Lake Summerset On-Line

Census-designated places in Stephenson County, Illinois
Census-designated places in Winnebago County, Illinois
Census-designated places in Illinois
Rockford metropolitan area, Illinois